Guatemala competed at the 1988 Summer Paralympics in Seoul, South Korea. 1 competitor from Guatemala won a single gold medal and finished 38th medal table.

See also 
 Guatemala at the Paralympics
 Guatemala at the 1988 Summer Olympics

References 

Nations at the 1988 Summer Paralympics
1988
Summer Paralympics